Moltke Township may refer to the following townships in the United States:

 Moltke Township, Michigan
 Moltke Township, Sibley County, Minnesota

Township name disambiguation pages